The common brown leafhopper, Orosius orientalis (Matsumura) (Hemiptera: Cicadellidae) is one of the most common species of Australian leafhoppers with a very wide host range. It is an important vector of several viruses and phytoplasmas worldwide. In Australia, phytoplasmas vectored by O. orientalis cause a range of economically important diseases including legume little leaf, tomato big bud, lucerne witches broom, potato purple top wilt, Australian lucerne and the insect is a possible vector of Australian grapevine yellows. O. orientalis also transmits Tobacco yellow dwarf virus (TYDV genus Mastrevirus, family Geminiviridae) to beans, causing bean summer death disease and to tobacco, causing tobacco yellow dwarf disease.

Although some direct damage caused by leafhopper feeding has been observed, it is relatively minor compared to the losses resulting from disease.

References

 Evans, J. W. (1966). The leafhoppers and froghoppers of Australia and New Zealand (Homoptera: Cicadelloidea and Cercopoidea). The Australian Museum Memoir, XII, 1–348.
 Grylls, N. E. (1979). Leafhopper vectors in Australia. In Leafhopper Vectors and Plant Disease Agents (Ed. K Maramorosch and K F Harris.). Academic Press New York, 179–214.
 Helson, G. A. H. (1951). The transmission of witches broom virus disease of lucerne by the common brown leafhopper, Orosius argentatus (Evans). Australian Journal of Scientific Research, Series B - Biological Science, 4(2), 115–124.
 Hill, A. V. (1941). Yellow dwarf of tobacco in Australia, II. Transmission by the jassid Thamnotettix argentata (Evans). Journal of Council of Scientific and Industrial Research, 14(3), 181–186.
 Osmelak, J. A. (1986). Assessment of various insecticides for the control of the vector Orosius argentatus (Evans) (Homoptera: Cicadellidae) and tomato big bud diseases. Department of Agricultural and Rural Affairs. Research Report(30), 1-32.
 Pilkington, L. J., Gurr, G. M., Fletcher, M. J., Nikandrow, A., & Elliott, E. (2004). Vector status of three leafhopper species for Australian lucerne yellows phytoplasma. Australian Journal of Entomology, 42, 366–373.
 Trębicki, P., Harding, R. M., & Powell, K. S. (2009). Antimetabolic effects of Galanthus nivalis agglutinin and wheat germ agglutinin on nymphal stages of the common brown leafhopper using a novel artificial diet system. Entomologia Experimentalis et Applicata, 131(1), 99–105.

External links
 Identification keys and checklists for the leafhoppers, planthoppers and their relatives occurring in Australia and neighbouring areas (Hemiptera: Auchenorrhyncha

Insect vectors of plant pathogens
Hemiptera of Australia
Opsiini
Taxa named by Shōnen Matsumura